These are the full results of the 1999 European Cup Super League in athletics which was held on 19 and 20 June 1999 at the Stade Charlety in Paris, France.

Team standings

Men's results

100 metres
19 JuneWind: -0.8 m/s

200 metres
20 JuneWind: +0.2 m/s

400 metres
19 June

800 metres
20 June

1500 metres
19 June

3000 metres
20 June

5000 metres
19 June

110 metres hurdles
20 JuneWind: +0.5 m/s

400 metres hurdles
19 June

3000 metres steeplechase
20 June

4 × 100 metres relay
19 June

4 × 400 metres relay
20 June

High jump
19 June

Pole vault
20 June

Long jump
19 June

Triple jump
20 June

Shot put
19 June

Discus throw
20 June

Hammer throw
19 June

Javelin throw
20 June

Women's results

100 metres
19 JuneWind: +0.5 m/s

200 metres
20 JuneWind: +0.7 m/s

400 metres
19 June

800 metres
19 June

1500 metres
20 June

3000 metres
19 June

5000 metres
20 June

100 metres hurdles
20 JuneWind: -0.4 m/s

400 metres hurdles
19 June

4 × 100 metres relay
19 June

4 × 400 metres relay
20 June

High jump
20 June

Pole vault
19 June

Long jump
20 June

Triple jump
19 June

Shot put
20 June

Discus throw
19 June

Hammer throw
20 June

Javelin throw
19 June

References

European Cup Super League
European
1999 in French sport
International athletics competitions hosted by France
Sport in Paris